My Brother's Keeper is the fourth studio album from underground hip hop duo OuterSpace, released on August 23, 2011 by Enemy Soil. The album features collaborations by Vinnie Paz, Ill Bill, Doap Nixon, Apathy, Blacastan, Esoteric, Sick Jacken, King Syze, and Zilla.

Track listing

References
 

2011 albums
OuterSpace albums